Paulette Dubost (8 October 1910 – 21 September 2011) was a French actress who began her career at the age of 7 at the Paris Opera.

She appeared in over 250 films and worked with directors such as Marcel Carné, Jean Renoir, Max Ophüls (Le Plaisir 1952 and Lola Montès, 1955) and François Truffaut. Her best-known role is as Lisette in Renoir's The Rules of the Game (La règle du jeu, 1939). Originally intended to be a small role offering only a couple of days' work, the extent of her part grew during the four-month shooting schedule.

She died three weeks before her 101st birthday.

Selected filmography

 J'ai quelque chose à vous dire (1931, Short)
 Le Bal (1931) - Mademoiselle Yvette, La cliente
 Un chien qui rapporte (1932) - Une locataire
 Amourous Adventure (1932)
 Un coup de téléphone (1932) - Clara
 Night Shift (1932) - La petite femme
 You Will Be My Wife (1932) - Annette
 The Regiment's Champion (1932)
 Un homme sans nom (1932)
 I by Day, You by Night (1932) - La collègue de Juliette
 Riri et Nono amoureux (1932)
 L'homme qui ne sait pas dire non (1932)
 En plein dans le mille (1932) - Paulette
 L'enfant de ma soeur (1933) - Radada
 Youth (1933) - Gisèle
 Paris-Soleil (1933)
 Rivaux de la piste (1933) - L'amie de Hanni Spengler
 Le Martyre de l'obèse (1933) - Babette
 Les vingt-huit jours de Clairette (1933) - Nichotte
 On the Streets (1933) - Pauline
 The Orderly (1933) - Marie
 To Be Loved (1933) - Maryse
 Cette nuit-là (1933) - Alice
 Maison hantée (1933)
 Le fakir du Grand Hôtel (1934) - Estelle
 George and Georgette (1934) - Lilian
 Vive la compagnie (1934) - Françoise Martin
 Une fois dans la vie (1934) - Josette
 La cinquième empreinte (1934) - Lucie Cavelier
 Happiness (1934, directed by Marcel L'Herbier) - Louise
 Le Roi des Champs-Élysées (1934) - Germaine
 L'auberge du Petit-Dragon (1934) - Marie
 Le billet de mille (1935)
 Studio à louer (1935) - Estelle
 Le comte Obligado (1935) - Mitaine
 Ferdinand le noceur (1935) - Paulette Fourageot
 La caserne en folie (1935) - Louisette
 La rosière des Halles (1935) - Célestine
 Le bébé de l'escadron (1935) - Anaïs
 La petite sauvage (1935) - Paulette
 Le prince des Six Jours (1936) - Mona, la danseuse
 La brigade en jupons (1936) - Paulette
 La reine des resquilleuses (1937)
 The Lie of Nina Petrovna (1937) - Lotte / Lottle
 Titin des Martigues (1938) - Yvette
 Barnabé (1938) - Rose
 L'ange que j'ai vendu (1938) - Esther Baronski
 Hôtel du Nord (1938, directed by Marcel Carné) - Ginette
 Le paradis des voleurs (1939) - Paulette
 La Règle du jeu (1939, directed by Jean Renoir) - Lisette, sa camériste
 Bécassine (1940) - Bécassine
 Opéra-musette (1942) - Jeanne
 I Am with You (1943) - La standardiste
 Adrien (1943) - Arlette Luciole
Farandole (1945) - La grue
 Roger la Honte (1946) - Victoire
 Happy Go Lucky (1946) - Brigitte Ancelin
 The Revenge of Roger (1946) - Victoire
 Six heures à perdre (1947) - Annette
 La Dernière Chevauchée (1947) - Milouda
 Plume la poule (1947)
 Ploum, ploum, tra-la-la (1947) - Germaine
 Et dix de der (1948) - Titine
 Blanc comme neige (1948) - Charlotte Béloiseau
 Le dolmen tragique (1948) - La vicomtesse de Kerlec
 Le bal des pompiers (1949) - Germaine
 My Aunt from Honfleur (1949) - Lucette
 La Femme nue (1949) - Suzon
 The Chocolate Girl (1949) - Julie
 Le 84 prend des vacances (1950) - Paulette Bernod
 Le Roi Pandore (1950) - Angèle
 Uniformes et grandes manoeuvres (1950) - Alice
 Tire au flanc (1950) - Georgette
 Four in a Jeep (1951) - Germaine Pasture
 Chéri de sa concierge (1951) - Mme Motte, la concierge
 Come Down, Someone Wants You (1951) - Irène
 Le Plaisir (House of Pleasure, 1952) - Madame Fernande (segment "La Maison Tellier")
 La fête à Henriette (Holiday for Henrietta 1952, directed by Julien Duvivier)  Virginie - la mère d'Henriette
 L'oeil en coulisses (1953) - Mme. Florent
 My Brother from Senegal (1953) - Séraphine - la servante de M. Pinson
 The Sheep Has Five Legs (1954) - Solange Saint-Forget
 The French, They Are a Funny Race (1955, directed by Preston Sturges) - Madame Taupin
 Lola Montès (1955) - Josephine, The maid
 Ces sacrées vacances (1956) - Madame Fouleur - la femme du brigadier
 La joyeuse prison (1956) - Justine Benoit
 Der 10. Mai (1957) - Madame Dubois
 Maigret Sets a Trap (1958) - Mauricette Barberot
 Mädchen in Uniform (1958) - Johanna
 The Adventures of Remi (1958) - Maman Barberin
 Taxi, Roulotte et Corrida (1958) - Germaine Berger
 Soupe au lait (1959) - Mme. Berthaut
 An Angel on Wheels (1959) - La mère de Line
 Way of Youth (1959) - Hélène Michaud
 Picnic on the Grass (1959) - Forestier
 Le Bossu (1959) - Dame Marthe
 La main chaude (1960) - Lise Lacoste
 Tendre et violente Elisabeth (1960) - Mme Lauriston
 Love and the Frenchwoman (1960) - Mme. Tronche (segment "Enfance, L'")
 Arrêtez les tambours (1961) - Widow
 Love Play (1961) - Anne's Maid
 The Seven Deadly Sins (1962) - Madame Jasmin (segment "Envie, L'") (uncredited)
 The Mysteries of Paris (1962) - Mme Pipelet
 Pourquoi Paris? (1962) - La restauratrice
 Enough Rope (1963) - Helen Kimmel
 Seul... à corps perdu (1963) - La servante
 Germinal (1963) - Rose, la servante
 Maigret Sees Red (1963) - La patronne de l'hôtel
 Banana Peel (1963) - Germaine Bontemps / Mme Bordas
 L'assassin viendra ce soir (1964) - Hélène Serval
 La dérive (1964) - La mère de Jacquie
 La chance et l'amour (1964) - Amélie Bizet (segment "Fiancés de la chance, Les")
 That Tender Age (1964) - Françoise Malhouin
 Black Humor (1965) - (segment 1 'La Bestiole')
 Viva Maria! (1965) - Mme Diogène
 Un garçon, une fille. Le dix-septième ciel (1966)
 The Sunday of Life (1967) - Madame Bijou
 Juliette and Juliette (1974) - Mme. Rozenec
 Dear Inspector (1977) - Mother
 Take It from the Top (1978) - La mère de Jean-Pierre
 La barricade du Point du Jour (1978) - Mme Lapoule
 La Gueule de l'autre (1979) - Mme Chalebouis
 Jupiter's Thigh (1980) - La mère de Lise
 The Last Metro (1980, directed by François Truffaut) - Germaine Fabre
 La vie continue (1981) - Elizabeth
 Le retour des bidasses en folie (1983) - La mère supérieure
 Charlots connection (1984) - La blanchisseuse
 La femme ivoire (1984) - Mme Pujol
 Julien Fontanes, magistrat (1985, TV Series) - Mémée Plantini
 Cent francs l'amour (1986) - Gracieuse
 Le Tiroir secret (1986-1987, TV Series)
 La comédie du travail (1988) - La libraire
 May Fools (Milou en mai, 1990) - Mrs. Vieuzac
 Feu sur le candidat (1990) - Miss Martinot
 Le Jour des rois (1991) - Suzanne
 Les Mamies (1992) - Victoire
 H'Biba M'Sika (1994)
 Le roi de Paris (1995) - Raymonde
 Augustin, King of Kung-Fu (1999) - Madame Haton, the old neighbor
 Les Savates du bon Dieu (2000) - La grand-mère
 Les yeux clairs (2005) - Madame Le Sciellour

References

External links
 

1910 births
2011 deaths
Actresses from Paris
French centenarians
French film actresses
20th-century French actresses
Women centenarians